Conquer Your World is a 1991 album by Excessive Force, a side project of KMFDM and My Life with the Thrill Kill Kult. After this release, Buzz McCoy no longer worked with Excessive Force. On November 6, 2007, this album was re-released with remastered audio, as well as the "Conquer Your House" single as bonus tracks.

Track listing

Personnel 
 Sascha Konietzko – vocals, programming, bass (8)
 Buzz McCoy – bass, programming
 Reverend A Chester – vocals (7)
 Jacky Blacque – vocals
 En Esch – drums (8)
 Svetlana Ambrosius – guitars

References 

1991 albums
Excessive Force albums